Lysobacter aestuarii is a Gram-positive and rod-shaped bacterium from the genus of Lysobacter which has been isolated from tidal flat sediments.

References

External links
Type strain of Lysobacter aestuarii at BacDive -  the Bacterial Diversity Metadatabase

Bacteria described in 2016
Xanthomonadales